Foley Peak is a mountain in the Cheam Range, located in southwestern British Columbia, Canada near Chilliwack. It is one of the easternmost peaks in the range, situated west of Conway Peak and east of Welch Peak. The mountain is named after one of the partners in the engineering firm Foley, Welch and Stewart who built and operated the Lucky Four Mine located near the peak. Nearby peaks are also named after the other partners (Stewart Peak and Welch Peak).

References

Two-thousanders of British Columbia
Canadian Cascades
Landforms of Lower Mainland
Yale Division Yale Land District